Tirunelveli Dakshina Mara Nadar Sangam College, also known as T.D.M.N.S. College, is a general degree college located in T.Kallikulam, Tirunelveli, Tamil Nadu. It was established in the year 1965. The college is affiliated with Manonmaniam Sundaranar University. This college offers different courses in arts, commerce and science.

Departments

Science
Physics
Chemistry
Mathematics
Botany
Computer Science
Information Technology

Arts and Commerce
Tamil
English
History
Economics
Commerce

Accreditation
The college is  recognized by the University Grants Commission (UGC).

References

External links
http://www.tdmnsc.com

Educational institutions established in 1971
1971 establishments in Tamil Nadu
Colleges affiliated to Manonmaniam Sundaranar University
Universities and colleges in Tirunelveli district